Jake Szymanski is an actor-writer-director-producer, known for Funny or Die, SNL Digital Shorts, Mike and Dave Need Wedding Dates (2016), 7 Days in Hell (2015), Tour de Pharmacy (2017), and The Package (2018).

Filmography

Funny or Die
 McCain's Roommates (2008)
 It's the Ass 'n Balls Show! (2008)
 Eva Longoria Sex Tape (2008)
 Paris Hilton Responds to McCain Ad (2008)
 High-Five Hollywood! (2008)
 Gina Gershon Strips Down Sarah Palin (2008)
 Ron Howard's Call to Action (2008)
 Paris Hilton Gets Presidential with Martin Sheen (2008)
 The Kevin Bacon Movie Club (2008)
 Obama (2008)
 Bat Fight with Will Ferrell (2009)
 Cougar 101 (2009)
 T-Pain vs. His Vocoder (2009)
 The Uncler (2009)
 Zac Efron's Pool Party (2009)
 Denise Richards' Funbags (2009)
 Attack Cardio (2009)
 Red Bull Energy Douche (2009)
 Nicole Eggert Is Back in Baywatch (2009)
 Lashisse (2009)
 Molly Sims Dramatic Acting Reel (2009)
 Three Matthew McConaugheys and a Baby (2009)
 Pete Carroll's Trip to Seattle Delayed (2010)
 Laptop Hunters: Brad (2010)
 Heidi Montag Says No to Plastic (2010)
 Presidential Reunion (2010)
 Forehead Tittaes (2010)
 Dirty Dancing 3: Capoeira Nights (2010)
 Kelly Brook's Cameltoe Shows (2010)
 Katie Couric Investigates the Sillies (2011)
 Betwixt the Music: Rebecca Black (2011)
 Forcin' the Blues (2011)
 Fish Gun (2011)
 World's Smallest Strike (2012)

Film
 Mike and Dave Need Wedding Dates (2016)
 The Package (2018)

Television
Saturday Night Live

TV movies
 Beef (2014)
 7 Days in Hell (2015)
 Tour de Pharmacy (2017)

TV series

References

Year of birth missing (living people)
Living people
American male television actors
American television directors
American television producers
American television writers
Funny or Die
American male television writers